Great Northern Railway Class BT were a class of 13  tank locomotives introduced by the GNR(I) from 1885.  

While fit for purpose when built, increasing train weights particularly with bogie carriages a factor meant by the 1920s they were underpowered for all available work and were withdrawn by 1921.

References

 
 

4-4-0T locomotives
Railway locomotives introduced in 1885
5 ft 3 in gauge locomotives
Steam locomotives of Northern Ireland
Steam locomotives of Ireland
P
Scrapped locomotives